Picture Butte is a town in southern Alberta, Canada. It claims the title of "Livestock Feeding Capital of Canada."

History 
Picture Butte received its name from a prominence southeast of town. By 1947, however, the prominence's soil had been reworked and used for street improvements, highway construction and a dyke on the shore of the Picture Butte Lake Reservoir. The prominence no longer exists.

Homesteading in the area began in the early 20th century. The building of the Lethbridge Northern Irrigation System in 1923 and the CPR rail line in 1925 stimulated an influx of settlers.  The first post office opened in 1925.

In 1943, Picture Butte became a village, and it attained town status in 1961 with a population of 978.

The Canadian Sugar Factory closed in 1978 and resulted in the loss of tax revenues and employment opportunities to the town. Industrial activity consists of small service, warehousing and wholesaling industries.

Demographics 

In the 2016 Census of Population conducted by Statistics Canada, the Town of Picture Butte recorded a population of 1,810 living in 672 of its 706 total private dwellings, a  change from its 2011 population of 1,650.

Governance
The current Picture Butte town council was elected on October 18, 2021 in the 2021 Alberta municipal elections.

 Mayor: Cathy Moore
 Councillors: 
 Henry deKok
 Teresa Feist
 Cynthia Papworth
 Scott Thomson

Notable people 
 Rick Casson, politician

See also 
List of communities in Alberta
List of towns in Alberta

References

External links 

1943 establishments in Alberta
Lethbridge County
Towns in Alberta